Petukhovskaya is a rural locality (a village) in Muravyovskoye Rural Settlement of Velsky District, Arkhangelsk Oblast, Russia. The population was 178 as of 2014. There are 2 streets.

Geography 
Petukhovskaya is located 7 km northeast of Velsk (the district's administrative centre) by road. Gorka Muravyovskaya is the nearest rural locality.

References 

Rural localities in Velsky District